Francesco Caruso  (born 1 January 1968) is Melbourne Laureate Professor and National Health and Medical Research Council (NHMRC) Senior Principal Research Fellow in the School of Chemical and Biomolecular Engineering at the University of Melbourne, Australia. Caruso is deputy director of the Australian Research Council (ARC) Centre of Excellence in Convergent Bio-Nanoscience and Technology.

Education
Caruso received his PhD in 1994 from the University of Melbourne for research on lateral diffusion of amphiphiles in air-water monolayers and Langmuir–Blodgett films.

Career and research
Caruso conducted postdoctoral research at the Commonwealth Scientific and Industrial Research Organisation (CSIRO) Division of Chemicals and Polymers. From 1997 to 2002, he was an Alexander von Humboldt Foundation Research Fellow with Helmuth Möhwald and group leader at the Max Planck Institute of Colloids and Interfaces in Berlin. Since 2003, he has been a professor at the University of Melbourne and has held ARC Federation and ARC Australian Laureate Fellowships. He was elected a Fellow of the Australian Academy of Science (FAA) in 2009 and was awarded the Eureka Prize for Leadership in Science by CSIRO in 2013.

Caruso has published over 400 peer-reviewed papers and was on Thomson Reuters’ 2014 list of World's Most Influential Scientific Minds. He is an executive editor of American Chemical Society (ACS) Chemistry of Materials and is on the editorial advisory board of ten other scientific journals.

References

Living people
Fellows of the Royal Society
Fellows of the Australian Academy of Science
1968 births